Beet yellows virus (BYV) is a plant pathogenic virus of the family Closteroviridae. Beet yellows virus is transmitted by multiple species of aphid and causes a yellowing disease in Beta vulgaris and Spinacia oleracea.

See also
 Beet pseudoyellows virus

References

External links
 
 ICTVdB - The Universal Virus Database: Beet yellows virus
 Family Groups - The Baltimore Method

Viral plant pathogens and diseases
Closteroviridae